Jack Mitchell is an American businessperson, author, and motivational speaker. He is the chairman of the Mitchells Family of Stores. In 2005, he was included on Inc. magazine's list of 26 Most Fascinating Entrepreneurs.

Early life and education 
Mitchell earned a  Bachelor of Arts from Wesleyan University in 1961, and later obtained a master of arts in Chinese history from the University of California, Berkeley, in 1963, planning to become a diplomat in China-United States relations.

Career
The Mitchells Family of Stores was founded in 1958  as "Ed Mitchell's" by Mitchell's parents, Ed and Norma Mitchell. The original Westport, Connecticut, shop had only  800 ft2 of  space and  five men's suit styles. Jack joined the company in  1969. The company acquired Richards of Greenwich, Connecticut in 1995, Marsh's of Long Island, New York, in 2005 (now called Mitchells), Wilkes Bashford of San Francisco and Palo Alto in 2009, and Marios in Seattle and Portland, Oregon, in October 2015.

Published works 
 Hug Your Customers: The Proven Way to Personalize Sales and Achieve Astounding Results (2003)
 Hug Your People: The Proven Way to Hire, Inspire, and Recognize Your Employees and Achieve Remarkable Results (2008)
 Selling the 'Hug Your Customers Way': The Proven Process for Becoming a Passionate and Successful Salesperson for Life (2018)

References

Living people
American male writers
American motivational speakers
American fashion businesspeople
Year of birth missing (living people)